In re Debs, 158 U.S. 564 (1895), was a US labor law case of the United States Supreme Court decision handed down concerning Eugene V. Debs and labor unions.

Background
Eugene V. Debs, president of the American Railway Union, had been involved in the Pullman Strike earlier in 1894 and challenged the federal injunction ordering the strikers back to work where they would face being fired. The injunction had been issued because of the violent nature of the strike. However, Debs refused to end the strike and was subsequently cited for contempt of court; he appealed the decision to the courts.

The main question being debated was whether the federal government had a right to issue the injunction, which dealt with both interstate and intrastate commerce and shipping on rail cars.

Judgment

Justice David Josiah Brewer for a unanimous court held that the U.S. government had a right to regulate interstate commerce and ensure the operations of the Postal Service, along with a responsibility to "ensure the general welfare of the public." Justice Brewer said the following in summing up the judgment:

Significance
In Loewe v. Lawlor the Supreme Court stated that unions were in fact potentially liable for antitrust violations. In response Congress passed the Clayton Act of 1914 to take unions out of antitrust law. Debs would go on to lose another Supreme Court case in Debs v. United States.

See also

US labor law
 In re
 Debs v. United States
 List of United States Supreme Court cases, volume 158

Notes

References
 Papke, David Ray. (1999) The Pullman Case: The Clash of Labor and Capital in Industrial America. Lawrence, Kansas: University Press of Kansas

External links
 
 

United States Constitution Article One case law
United States Supreme Court cases
United States Commerce Clause case law
United States labor case law
1895 in United States case law
Rail transport strikes
United States Supreme Court cases of the Fuller Court
Eugene V. Debs